"The Sound of Silence," originally "The Sounds of Silence," is a song by the American music duo Simon & Garfunkel. It is said that the song was written by Paul Simon over several months in 1963 and 1964.  The duo's studio audition of the song led to a record deal with Columbia Records, and the original acoustic version was recorded in March 1964 at Columbia Studios in New York City for their debut album, Wednesday Morning, 3 A.M. Released on October 19, 1964, the album was a commercial failure and led to the duo disbanding; Simon returned to England, and Art Garfunkel to his studies at Columbia University.

In 1965, the song began to attract airplay at radio stations in Boston and throughout Florida. The growing airplay led Tom Wilson, the song's producer, to remix the track, overdubbing electric instruments and drums. This remixed version was released as a single in September 1965. Simon & Garfunkel were not informed of the song's remix until after its release. The remix hit No. 1 on the Billboard Hot 100 for the week ending January 1, 1966, leading the duo to reunite and hastily record their second album, which Columbia titled Sounds of Silence in an attempt to capitalize on the song's success. The remixed single version of the song was included on this follow-up album. Later, it was featured in the 1967 film The Graduate and was included on the film's soundtrack album. It was additionally released on the Mrs. Robinson EP in 1968, along with three other songs from the film: "Mrs. Robinson," "April Come She Will" and "Scarborough Fair/Canticle."

"The Sound of Silence" was a top-ten hit in multiple countries worldwide, among them Australia, Austria, West Germany, Japan and the Netherlands. Generally considered a classic folk rock song, the song was added to the National Recording Registry in the Library of Congress for being "culturally, historically, or aesthetically important" in 2012, along with the rest of the Sounds of Silence album. Since its release, the song was included in later compilations, beginning with the 1972 compilation album Simon and Garfunkel's Greatest Hits.

Background

Origin and original recording

Simon and Garfunkel had become interested in folk music and the growing counterculture movement separately in the early 1960s. Having performed together previously under the name Tom and Jerry in the late 1950s, their partnership had since dissolved when they began attending college. In 1963, they regrouped and began performing Simon's original compositions locally in Queens. They billed themselves "Kane & Garr," after old recording pseudonyms, and signed up for Gerde's Folk City, a Greenwich Village club that hosted Monday night performances. In September 1963, the duo performed three new songs, among them "The Sound of Silence," getting the attention of Columbia Records producer Tom Wilson, a young African-American jazz musician who was also helping to guide Bob Dylan's transition from folk to rock. Simon convinced Wilson to let him and his partner have a studio audition; their  performance of "The Sound of Silence" got the duo signed to Columbia.

The song's origin and basis are unclear, with some thinking that the song commented on the assassination of John F. Kennedy, as the song was recorded three months after the assassination, though Simon & Garfunkel had performed the song live as Kane & Garr two months before the assassination.  Simon wrote "The Sound of Silence" when he was 21 years old, with Simon explaining that the song was written in his bathroom, where he turned off the lights to better concentrate. "The main thing about playing the guitar, though, was that I was able to sit by myself and play and dream. And I was always happy doing that. I used to go off in the bathroom, because the bathroom had tiles, so it was a slight echo chamber. I'd turn on the faucet so that water would run (I like that sound, it's very soothing to me) and I'd play. In the dark. 'Hello darkness, my old friend / I've come to talk with you again.'" According to Garfunkel, the song was first developed in November, but Simon took three months to perfect the lyrics, which he claims were entirely written on February 19, 1964. Garfunkel, introducing the song at a live performance (with Simon) in Harlem, June 1966, summed up the song's meaning as "the inability of people to communicate with each other, not particularly intentionally but especially emotionally, so what you see around you are people unable to love each other."

In a memoir by Sandy Greenberg, Greenberg states he believes the song reflected the strong bond he had with his college best friend, Garfunkel, who adopted the epithet "Darkness" so as to empathise with Greenberg's sudden-onset blindness while in college, even though the song was written by Paul Simon.

To promote the release of their debut album, Wednesday Morning, 3 A.M., the duo performed again at Folk City, as well as two shows at the Gaslight Café, which went over poorly. Dave Van Ronk, a folk singer, was at the performances, and noted that several in the audience regarded their music as a joke. Sounds of Silence' actually became a running joke: for a while there, it was only necessary to start singing 'Hello darkness, my old friend ... ' and everybody would crack up." Wednesday Morning, 3 AM sold only 3,000 copies upon its October release, and its dismal sales led Simon to move to London. While there, he recorded a solo album, The Paul Simon Songbook (1965), which features a rendition of the song, titled "The Sound of Silence" (instead of "The Sounds of Silence," as on Wednesday Morning, 3 A.M.).

The original recording of the song is in D♯ minor, using the chords D♯m, C♯, B and F♯. Simon plays a guitar with a capo on the sixth fret, using the shapes for Am, G, F and C chords. He provides the lower vocals for harmony while Garfunkel sings the melody. The vocal span goes from C♯3 to F♯4 in the song.

Remix

Wednesday Morning, 3 A.M. had been a commercial failure before producer Tom Wilson was alerted that radio stations had begun to play "The Sound of Silence" in spring 1965. A late-night disc jockey at WBZ in Boston began to spin "The Sound of Silence", where it found a college demographic. Students at Harvard and Tufts University responded well, and the song made its way down the east coast pretty much "overnight", "all the way to Cocoa Beach, Florida, where it caught the students coming down for spring break." A promotional executive for Columbia went to give away free albums of new artists, and beach-goers were interested only in the artists behind "The Sound of Silence." He phoned the home office in New York, alerting them of its appeal. An alternate version of the story states that Wilson attended Columbia's July 1965 convention in Miami, where the head of the local sales branch raved about the song's airplay.

Folk rock was beginning to make waves on pop radio, with songs like the Byrds' "Mr. Tambourine Man" charting high. Wilson listened to the song several times, considering it too soft for a wide release. Wilson had strong feeling about editing the song with explicit rock overtones. As stated by Geoffrey Himes, "If Columbia Records producer Tom Wilson hadn’t taken the initiative, without the singers’ knowledge, to dub a rock rhythm section over their folk rendition, the song never would have become a cultural touchstone—a generation's shorthand for alienation." Wilson had also experimented the previous December with overdubbing an electric band over acoustic tracks by Bob Dylan; these recordings were never officially released, as Dylan and Wilson opted to record new tracks with a live band for what would become the album Bringing It All Back Home.

On June 15, 1965, following sessions for Dylan's "Like a Rolling Stone," Wilson retained guitarist Al Gorgoni and drummer Bobby Gregg from the Dylan sessions, adding guitarist Vinnie Bell and bassist Bob Bushnell. The tempo on the original recording was uneven, making it difficult for the musicians to keep the song in time. Engineer Roy Halee employed a heavy echo on the remix, which was a common trait of the Byrds' hits. The single was first serviced to college FM rock stations, and a commercial single release followed on September 13, 1965. The lack of consultation with Simon and Garfunkel on the remix was because, although the duo was still contracted to Columbia Records, the duo was no longer a "working entity." It was not unusual for producers to add instruments or vocals to previous releases and re-release them as new products.

In the fall of 1965, Simon was in Denmark, performing at small clubs, and picked up a copy of Billboard, as he had routinely done for several years. Upon seeing "The Sound of Silence" in the Billboard Hot 100, he bought a copy of Cashbox and saw the same thing. Several days later, Garfunkel excitedly called Simon to inform him of the single's growing success. A copy of the 7-inch single arrived in the mail the next day, and according to friend Al Stewart, "Paul was horrified when he first heard it ... [when the] rhythm section slowed down at one point so that Paul and Artie's voices could catch up." Garfunkel was far less concerned about the remix, feeling conditioned to the process of trying to create a hit single: "It's interesting, I suppose it might do something, It might sell," he told Wilson.

Lyrics
The lyrics of the song are written in five stanzas of seven lines each. Each stanza begins with a couplet describing the setting of the scene, followed by a couplet driving the action forward and another couplet expressing the climactic thought of the verse, and closes with a one-line refrain referring to "the sound of silence". This structure is supported by a melodic contour, where the first and second lines are paired with the arpeggio A-C-E-D and a repeat a step lower, respectively. The arpeggio is then stretched to become C-E-G-A-G and repeated twice in the second couplet. For the last three lines, the contour then leaps from C to the higher A, rises to the higher C, and then falls back to the A before singing the stretched arpeggio in reverse and finally retreating to the lower A. The progress of the lyrics through its five stanzas places the singer into an incrementally increasing tension with an increasingly ambiguous "sound of silence". The irony of using the word "sound" to describe silence in the title lyrics suggests a paradoxical symbolism being used by the singer, which the lyrics of the fourth stanza eventually identifies as "silence like a cancer grows". The "sound of silence" is symbolically taken also to denote the cultural alienation associated with much of the 1960s. In the counterculture movements of the 1960s, the phrase "sound of silence" can be compared to other more commonly used turns of phrase such as "turning a deaf ear" often associated with the detachment experienced with impersonal large governments.

The first stanza presents the singer as taking some relative solace in the peacefulness he associates with "darkness" which is submerged "within" the ambiguous sound of silence. The second stanza has the effect of breaking into the silence with "the flash of a neon light" which leaves the singer "touched" by the enduring ambiguity of the sound of silence. In the third stanza, a "naked light" emerges as a vision of 10,000 people all caught within their own solitude and alienation without any one of them daring to "disturb" the recurring sound of silence.

In the fourth stanza, the singer proclaims in a declarative voice that "silence like a cancer grows," though his words "like silent raindrops fell" without ever being heard against the by now cancerous sound of silence. The fifth stanza appears to culminate with the urgency raised by the declarative voice in the fourth stanza through the apparent triumph of a false "neon god". The false neon god is only challenged when a "sign flashed out its warning" that only the words of the indigent written on "subway walls and tenement halls" could still "whisper" their truth against the recurring and ambiguous form of "the sound of silence". The song has no lyrical bridge or change of key, and was written without any lyrical intro or outro to start or end the song.

Personnel 

 Paul Simon – acoustic guitar, vocals
 Art Garfunkel – vocals
 Barry Kornfeld – acoustic guitar
 Bill Lee – double bass
(electric overdubs) personnel
 Al Gorgoni, Vinnie Bell – guitar
 Joe Mack (also known as Joe Macho) – bass guitar
 Bobby Gregg – drums

Charts performance

Charts history
"The Sound of Silence" first broke in Boston, where it became one of the top-selling singles in early November 1965; it spread to Miami and Washington, D.C. two weeks later, reaching number one in Boston and debuting on the Billboard Hot 100.

Throughout the month of January 1966 "The Sound of Silence" had a one-on-one battle with the Beatles' "We Can Work It Out" for the No. 1 spot on the Billboard Hot 100. The former was No. 1 for the weeks of January 1 and 22 and No. 2 for the intervening two weeks. The latter held the top spot for the weeks of January 8, 15, and 29, and was No. 2 for the two weeks that "The Sound of Silence" was No. 1. Overall, "The Sound of Silence" spent 14 weeks on the Billboard chart.

In the wake of the song's success, Simon promptly returned to the United States to record a new Simon & Garfunkel album at Columbia's request. He later described his experiences learning the song went to No. 1, a story he repeated in numerous interviews:

For his part, Garfunkel had a different memory of the song's success:

Weekly charts

Paul Simon solo version

Year-end charts

Certifications

Cover by The Bachelors
Simon and Garfunkel's version did not chart in either the UK or Ireland, losing out to a cover version by the Irish group The Bachelors, whose version peaked at number three in the UK and number nine in Ireland.

Chart performance

Cover by Disturbed

50 years after its original release, a cover version of "The Sound of Silence" was released by American heavy metal band Disturbed on December 7, 2015. A music video was also released. Their cover hit number one on the Billboard Hard Rock Digital Songs and Mainstream Rock charts, and is their highest-charting song on the Hot 100, peaking at number 42. It is also their highest-charting single in Australia, peaking at number four. David Draiman sings it in the key of F#m. His vocal span goes from E2 to A4 in scientific pitch notation.

In April 2016, Paul Simon endorsed the cover. Additionally, on April 1, Simon sent Draiman an email praising Disturbed's performance of the rendition on American talk show Conan. Simon wrote, "Really powerful performance on Conan the other day. First time I'd seen you do it live. Nice. Thanks." Draiman responded, "Mr. Simon, I am honored beyond words. We only hoped to pay homage and honor to the brilliance of one of the greatest songwriters of all time. Your compliment means the world to me/us and we are eternally grateful." As of September 2017, the single had sold over 1.5 million digital downloads and had been streamed over 54 million times, estimated Nielsen Music. As of January 2023, the music video has over 870 million views on YouTube, while the live performance on Conan has over 131 million, making it the most watched YouTube video from the show.

Accolades

Weekly charts

Year-end charts

Decade-end charts

Certifications

Legacy

Paul Simon released a solo acoustic version of "The Sound of Silence" in the spring of 1974. His version reached No. 84 in Canada and No. 97 on the US Cash Box chart.  It was also a minor Adult Contemporary hit (US No. 50, Canada No. 42).

In 1999, BMI named "The Sound of Silence" as the 18th most-performed song of the 20th century. In 2004, it was ranked No. 156 on Rolling Stone list of the 500 Greatest Songs of All Time, one of the duo's three songs on the list. The song is now considered "the quintessential folk rock release." On March 21, 2013, the song was added to the National Recording Registry in the Library of Congress for long-term preservation along with the rest of the Sounds of Silence album.

On September 27, 2016, the Disturbed version of "The Sound of Silence" was released as downloadable content for the video game Rock Band 4. The Disturbed version was used in the episode "Ian Garvey" of The Blacklist in November 2017. A live version of "The Sound of Silence" with guest Myles Kennedy is included on Live at Red Rocks and Evolution (Deluxe Edition). The AMC show Into the Badlands features Disturbed's version of "The Sound of Silence" in episode 13 of season 3 ("Black Lotus, White Rose") in April 2019.

The a cappella group Pentatonix recorded a cover of the song, released as a single in 2019. The video amassed more than 50 million views in a year. By the end of 2021, the YouTube video has had almost 114 million views.

In popular culture

Film and television
When director Mike Nichols and Sam O'Steen were editing the 1967 film The Graduate, they initially timed some scenes to this song, intending to substitute original music for the scenes. However, they eventually concluded that an adequate substitute could not be found and decided to purchase the rights for the song for the soundtrack. This was an unusual decision, as the song had charted more than a year earlier, and recycling established music for film was not commonly done at the time.

With the practice of using well-known songs for films becoming more commonplace, "The Sound of Silence" has since been used for other films, including Kingpin (1996), Old School (2003), Bobby (2006), Watchmen (2009), Trolls (2016), and A Twelve Year Night (2018). In the German TV movie Ein Drilling kommt selten allein the song was sung by grandparents to calm down crying triplets.

The song was used during the fourth season of the television series Arrested Development in 2013 as a running gag alluding to characters' (primarily GOB's) inner reflections. It was also used as part of the soundtrack of episode 4 of The Vietnam War, the 2017 documentary series by Ken Burns and Lynn Novick. The Disturbed cover appeared in the soundtrack of episode 8 of season 5 of the TV series The Blacklist. In episode 8, season 2 of the mystery-comedy TV series Only Murders in the Building, titled "Hello, Darkness", the residents of the eponymous building sing the song during a blackout.

Other allusions and parodies
The Canadian band Rush alluded to the song lyrics in the last lines of their 1980 song "The Spirit of Radio."

The 1994 fifth season episode of The Simpsons "Lady Bouvier's Lover" has a parody of the song called "The Sound of Grampa" over a scene that parodies the end of the 1967 movie The Graduate.

In the Gdansk’s Sound of Silence.

Faith-based comedian Tim Hawkins parodied the song (as "Sounds of Starbucks") on October 16, 2018.

In January 2020, American rapper Eminem released the song "Darkness", which interpolates "The Sound of Silence" and uses its opening line, "Hello, darkness, my old friend."

On February 8, 2020, Madonna sang the song as part of her Madame X Tour at the London Palladium.

On August 10, 2021, The Holderness Family released a parody version about wanting the children out of the house for school following the lockdowns and school closings due to the COVID-19 pandemic.

References
Notes

Bibliography

External links
 
 

1965 songs
1965 singles
1960s ballads
1974 singles
2016 singles
Songs written by Paul Simon
Simon & Garfunkel songs
Mercy (band) songs
Disturbed (band) songs
Anna Kendrick songs
The Bachelors songs
Song recordings produced by Tom Wilson (record producer)
Billboard Hot 100 number-one singles
Cashbox number-one singles
Number-one singles in Austria
Number-one singles in South Africa
Oricon Weekly number-one singles
CBS Records singles
Columbia Records singles
Reprise Records singles
Folk ballads
Rock ballads
Silence
Black-and-white music videos
United States National Recording Registry recordings